Mark, Don & Mel: 1969–71 is a rock album by Grand Funk Railroad that was released in 1972. It is a compilation of early highlights from both studio and live performances while the band was managed by Terry Knight.  It peaked at number 17 on the Billboard 200 and has been certified gold by the RIAA.

Track listing 
Sides run 1, 4, 2, 3
All tracks written by Mark Farner, except where noted.

Side one
 "Time Machine" - (3:40)
 "Into the Sun" - (6:25)
 "Heartbreaker" - (6:30)
 "Feelin' Alright" (Dave Mason) - (4:25)

Side two
 "Footstompin' Music" - (3:45)
 "Paranoid" - (7:35)
 "Loneliness" - (8:30)

Side three
 "Are You Ready" (Live) - (3:34)
 "Mean Mistreater" (Live) - (4:40)
 "T.N.U.C." (Live) - (11:45)

Side four
 "Inside Looking Out" (John Lomax, Alan Lomax, Eric Burdon, Chas Chandler) - (9:29)
 "I'm Your Captain (Closer to Home)" - (9:58)

References 

1972 compilation albums
Grand Funk Railroad compilation albums
Albums produced by Terry Knight
Capitol Records compilation albums